The Lucre District is one of the twelve districts in the Quispicanchi Province in Peru. Created by Law No. 9295 on January 17, 1941, its capital is the town of Lucre.

Geography 
Other mountains are listed below:

Ethnic groups 
The people in the district are mainly indigenous citizens of Quechua descent. Quechua is the language which the majority of the population (57.36%) learnt to speak in childhood, 42.31% of the residents started speaking using the Spanish language (2007 Peru Census).

See also 
 Chuqi Pukyu
 Pikillaqta
 Rumiqullqa

References  

  Instituto Nacional de Estadística e Informática. Departamento Cusco. Retrieved on November 2, 2007.